Latina University of Panama (Universidad Latina de Panamá) is a private university, located in Panama City, Panama. Established in 1991, it is now considered one of the largest private universities in the country.

History 

The university has its roots in the Latina University of Costa Rica, established in Paso Canoas, Province of Puntarenas (Costa Rica) in 1989.  In Panama it was inaugurated on September 4, 1991, with facilities in Panama City and David, Chiriquí. Two other facilities were later opened in Veraguas and Herrera. The College of Health Sciences was opened on September 26, 1999.

Academics 

The university has six faculties:

 Administrative and Economic Sciences
 Computer Sciences and Telecommunications
 Health Sciences
 Communication Sciences
 Education Sciences
 Law and Political Sciences
 Engineering

External links
 Official website

Latina de Panama
Buildings and structures in Panama City
Education in Panama City
1991 establishments in Panama